The Society of X-Ray Technology was a British professional association for work with X-rays.

History
The Institute of X-Ray Engineers was formed in 1944 in Liverpool, soon after changing its name to the Society of X-Ray Technology.

In the mid-1980s it was one of 51 societies in the new Engineering Council, in group four.

Merger
In 1990 it joined the Institute of Hospital Engineers, which became the Institute of Hospital Engineering and Estate Management, which is now the Institute of Healthcare Engineering and Estate Management.

Function
It published a journal, The Journal of X-ray Technology, twice a year and arranged lectures.

Structure
Those belonging to the organisation were physicists, radiographers, engineers and technicians.

See also
 Academy for Healthcare Science (United Kingdom)
 American Society of Radiologic Technologists
 Institute of Physics and Engineering in Medicine (IPEM)
 Society of Critical Care Technologies (SCCT)

References

1944 establishments in the United Kingdom
1990 disestablishments in the United Kingdom
Defunct professional associations based in the United Kingdom
Engineering societies based in the United Kingdom
Medical associations based in the United Kingdom
Organizations disestablished in 1990
Physics societies
Radiology organizations
Scientific organizations established in 1944
X-rays